Barbara Rachelson is an American politician who has served in the Vermont House of Representatives since 2014.

Rachelson was born in Glen Ridge, New Jersey. Raised in North Caldwell, New Jersey, she graduated from West Essex High School. She earned an undergraduate degree from Brandeis University and a graduate degree from the University of Michigan.

References

Living people
Brandeis University alumni
University of Michigan alumni
21st-century American politicians
21st-century American women politicians
Democratic Party members of the Vermont House of Representatives
Women state legislators in Vermont
People from Glen Ridge, New Jersey
People from North Caldwell, New Jersey
West Essex High School alumni
Year of birth missing (living people)